Chlorocypha tenuis is a species of damselfly in the family Chlorocyphidae. It is found in Burundi, the Republic of the Congo, the Democratic Republic of the Congo, Kenya, and Uganda. Its natural habitats are subtropical or tropical moist lowland forests and rivers. It is threatened by habitat loss.

References

Chlorocyphidae
Insects described in 1936
Taxonomy articles created by Polbot
Taxobox binomials not recognized by IUCN